Peter Pitirimovich Sorokin (10 July 1931 – 24 September 2015) was an American Russian physicist and co-inventor of the dye laser.  He was born in Boston and grew up in Winchester, Massachusetts. He attended Harvard University, receiving a BA degree in 1952 and a PhD in Applied Physics in 1958; his PhD thesis adviser was Nicolaas Bloembergen.

Peter Sorokin was a son of a prominent Russian sociologist Pitirim Sorokin and his wife Microbiologist Dr. Elena Baratynskaya, who belonged to Russian nobility. Sorokin joined IBM in 1958.  Sorokin and his colleague J. R. Lankard, at IBM Research Laboratories, used a ruby laser to excite a near infrared laser dye.  Their report was quickly followed by that of F. P. Schäfer. In 1974 Sorokin received the Albert A. Michelson Medal from the Franklin Institute. In 1983 Sorokin was awarded the Comstock Prize in Physics from the National Academy of Sciences and in 1984 the Harvey Prize from Israel's Technion. In 1991 he received the first Arthur L. Schawlow Prize in Laser Science from the American Physical Society. Sorokin is an IBM Fellow since 1968.  He was also a Fellow of the Optical Society of America. Toward the end of his career he became interested in astronomy. Sorokin died at the age of 84 on 24 September 2015 from injuries incurred in a fall in August.

References

1931 births
2015 deaths
American physicists
Laser researchers
IBM Fellows
Members of the United States National Academy of Sciences
American people of Russian descent
American people of Komi descent
Fellows of Optica (society)
Fellows of the American Physical Society
Harvard University alumni